The 2019 Georgia State Panthers football team represented Georgia State University (GSU) in the 2019 NCAA Division I FBS football season. The Panthers were led by third-year head coach Shawn Elliott. This was the Panthers' seventh season in the Sun Belt Conference, second within the East Division, and 10th since starting football. They played their home games at Georgia State Stadium.

Previous season
The Panthers finished the 2018 season 2–10, 1–7 in Sun Belt play to finish in last place in the East Division.

Recruiting

Preseason

Sun Belt coaches poll
The preseason poll was released prior to the Sun Belt media day on July 21, 2019. The Panthers were predicted to finish in fifth place in the Sun Belt East Division.

Preseason All-Sun Belt Teams
The Panthers had two players selected to the preseason all-Sun Belt teams.

Offense

2nd Team

Hunter Atkinson – OL

Special teams

1st Team

Brandon Wright – P

Personnel

Roster

Coaching and support staff

Schedule
Georgia State announced its 2019 football schedule on March 1, 2019. The 2019 schedule consists of six home and six away games for the regular season. The Panthers host Sun Belt foes Arkansas State, Troy, Appalachian State, and South Alabama, and travel to Texas State, Coastal Carolina, ULM, and in-state rivals Georgia Southern. Georgia State will not play Sun Belt foe Louisiana this year. The team will play four non-conference games, including home games against Furman, an FCS team from the Southern Conference, and Army, an FBS Independent, as well as away games at Tennessee of the Southeastern Conference (SEC) and Western Michigan of the Mid-American Conference (MAC)

Schedule Source:

Game summaries

at Tennessee

Furman

at Western Michigan

at Texas State

Arkansas State

at Coastal Carolina

Army

Troy

at Louisiana–Monroe

Appalachian State

South Alabama

at Georgia Southern

vs. Wyoming – Arizona Bowl

References

Georgia State
Georgia State Panthers football seasons
Georgia State Panthers football